The Egg and I is humorous memoir written by Betty MacDonald.

The Egg and I may also refer to:

The Egg and I (film), a 1947 film based on the book
 "The Egg and I" (Married... with Children episode), the 17th episode of season six of the television sitcom Married... with Children

See also
The Egg (disambiguation)